Christian M. M. Brady (born 1968) is an American scholar who specializes in biblical literature, rabbinic literature, and the targumim, especially Targum Lamentations and Targum Ruth. He is the inaugural Dean of the Lewis Honors College and Professor of Modern and Classical Languages, Literatures, and Cultures at the University of Kentucky (2017). He was  interim dean of the College of Arts & Sciences at the University of Kentucky from 2020-2022. He was Dean of the Schreyer Honors College from 2006-2016. He was formerly Associate Professor of Classical Studies and Jewish Studies at Tulane University. His administrative roles at Tulane included, Associate Director of the Jewish Studies Program (1997-1998), Director of the Jewish Studies Program (1998-2003), Associate Director of the Honors Program (2003-2004), and Director of the Honors Program (2004–2006).

Education
Brady grew up in Montgomery Village, Maryland and went to high school in Damascus, Maryland. He received a B.A. from Cornell University in History and Near Eastern Studies with a concentration in Religious Studies. He went on to earn an M.A. from Wheaton College, Illinois in Biblical and Theological Studies, a graduate diploma in Jewish Studies from the Oxford Centre for Hebrew and Jewish Studies at the University of Oxford, and a D.Phil. in Oriental Studies from the University of Oxford where he was a member of St. Cross College.

Books
 The Rabbinic Targum of Lamentations: Vindicating God, Studies in the Aramaic Interpretation of Scripture. Vol. 3. Leiden: E. J. Brill, 2003. 
 The Proselyte and the Prophet: Character Development in Targum Ruth, Supplements to Aramaic Studies. Vol. 14. Leiden: E. J. Brill, 2016.
 Beautiful and Terrible Things: A Christian Struggle with Suffering, Grief, and Hope. Louisville: Westminster John Knox Press, 2020.

Articles and Shorter Pieces
 “The Date, Provenance, and Sitz im Leben of Targum Lamentations,” Journal of the Aramaic Bible 1 (1999): 5-29.
 The following entries in The Eerdmans Dictionary of the Bible. Edited by David N. Freedman. Grand Rapids: Eerdmans, 2000.
 “Adino” 
 "Chezib”
 “Dial of Ahaz” 
 "Jashubi-Lehem” 
 “Kiriathaim”
 “Lilith”
 “Maonites” 
 “Pahath-Moab”
 “Rod” 
 "Sun”
 “Zuzim” 
 “The Role of the midat dinah in the Targumim.” Pages 364-374 in Studies in Scripture in Early Judaism and Christianity, The Interpretation of Scripture in Early Judaism and Christianity. Edited by Craig A. Evans. Sheffield: Sheffield Press, 2000.
 “Vindicating God,” Journal of the Aramaic Bible 3.1/2 (2001): 27-40.
 “Targum Lamentations 1.1-4: A Theological Prologue.” In Targum and Scripture: Studies in Aramaic Translation and Interpretation in Memory of Ernest G. Clarke. In Studies in the Aramaic Interpretation of Scripture. Edited by Ernest Ernest George Clarke, Paul Virgil McCracken Flesher. Leiden: Brill, 2002.
 The following entries in The Dictionary for Theological Interpretation of Scripture. Edited by Kevin J. Vanhoozer, Craig G. Bartholomew, Daniel J. Treier, and N. T. Wright. Grand Rapids: Baker Academic Press, 2005:
 “Lamentations"
 “Targum” 
 The following entries in The Brill Encyclopaedia of Early Religious and Philosophical Writings. Edited by Jacob Neusner and Alan J. Avery-Peck. Leiden: E. J. Brill, 2007:
 “Targum Canticles” 
 “Targum Ruth” 
 “Targum Lamentations” 
 “Targum Kohelet” 
 “Targum Esther” 
 “Targum Psalms” 
 “Targum Job”
 “Targum Proverbs”
 “Targumim to the Ketuvim”
 “Targum Chronicles”
 “The Use of Eschatological Lists In The Targumim To The Megillot,” Journal For The Study Of Judaism 40 (2009): 493-509.
 “Targum Lamentations”. In Great Is Thy Faithfulness? : Reading Lamentations As Sacred Scripture. Edited by Robin A. Parry and Heath Thomas. Eugene, Or.: Pickwick Publications, 2011.
 “Appendix 2: A Translation of Targum Lamentations”. In Great Is Thy Faithfulness? : Reading Lamentations As Sacred Scripture. Edited by Robin A. Parry and Heath Thomas. Eugene, Or.: Pickwick Publications, 2011.
 “‘God Is Not in This Classroom’ or Teaching the Bible in a Secular Context". In Teaching The Bible In The Liberal Arts Classroom. Edited by Glenn S. Holland and Jane S. Webster. Sheffield, UK: Sheffield Phoenix Press, 2012.
 “The Conversion of Ruth in Targum Ruth,” Review of Rabbinic Judaism 16.2(2013).
 “The Five Scrolls.” In The Textual History of the Bible. Edited by Armin Lange and Emanuel Tov. Leiden: Brill, Forthcoming.
 “What Shall We Remember,  The Deeds or The Faith of Our Ancestors?  A Comparison of 1 Maccabees 2 and Hebrews 11.” In Festscrift for Bruce Chilton. Edited by Jack Neusner and Craig Evans. Forthcoming. 
 “Exegetical Similarities and the Liturgical Use of the Targumim of the Megilloth,” Aramaic Studies 12 (2014).
 “What Shall We Remember, The Deeds or The Faith of Our Ancestors?  A Comparison of 1 Maccabees 2 and Hebrews 11.” In Earliest Christianity within the Boundaries of Judaism. Essays in Honor of Bruce Chilton. Ed., Neusner, Jack and Craig Evans. Leiden: Brill, 2016.
 “The Five Scrolls.” In The Textual History of the Bible. Ed., Lange, Armin, and Emanuel Tov. Leiden: Brill, 2016.

Family life
Dr. Brady is married to Elizabeth Walma Brady and they have a daughter Isabel (Izzy) and a son Mack who died aged 8 on December 31, 2012. Mack's death prompted an outpouring of sympathy from the local community. A scholarship fund established in Mack Brady's name supports Penn State soccer.

Blog and Podcasts
While dean of the Schreyer Honors College, Brady had a dynamic blog and podcast. The podcasts featured engaging conversations with Schreyer Scholars, his State of the College address, and his vision for the future of the honors college. Some of his blog posts have been moved to his personal site . Dean Brady also blogs about professional and personal issues at targuman.org .
In his new position as the Dean of the Lewis Honors College, he also somewhat regularly hosts a podcast. He often has faculty and students from UK appearing on this podcast alongside him. All podcasts are recorded live in the Honors College Lounge, and all Honors students are welcome to attend and interact with Dr. Brady.

Interesting Facts
Brady is also an ordained priest in the Episcopal Church (USA) and Canon Theologian for the Episcopal Diocese of Lexington (Kentucky). He served as a lay trustee (2004-2006) of the University of the South and was elected as a clergy trustee member in 2020.

Brady is a regular guest on the podcast "Real Tech for Real People" talking about issues of general tech and technology in education.

Appeared as a contestant on NPR’s “Wait, Wait, Don’t Tell Me” on February 27, 2021.

Bibliography
 Brady, Christian M. M. Beautiful and Terrible Things: A Christian Struggle with Suffering, Grief, and Hope (Louisville, KY: Westminster John Knox Press, 2020). .
 Brady, Christian M.M. The Proselyte and the Prophet: Character Development in Targum Ruth (Leiden: E. J. Brill, 2016). .
 Brady, Christian M.M. The Rabbinic Targum of Lamentations: Vindicating God (Leiden: E. J. Brill, 2003). .
 Brady, Christian M.M. “Targum Lamentations’ Reading of the Book of Lamentations” (1MB pdf), Doctoral Thesis, Oxford, 2000.
 Brady's English translation of Targum Lamentations.
 Brady's English translation of Targum Ruth.

References

External links 
 The Newsletter for Targumic and Cognate Literature
 ChristianBrady.com
 Targuman.org
 Tulane Honors Program
 Schreyer Honors College, The Pennsylvania State University
 Lewis Honors College, The University of Kentucky
 Official website of the Oriental Institute
 Oxford Centre for Hebrew and Jewish Studies

1968 births
Alumni of St Cross College, Oxford
Cornell University alumni
Christian Hebraists
Living people
Pennsylvania State University faculty
People from Montgomery Village, Maryland
Targums
Tulane University faculty
Wheaton College (Illinois) alumni
People from Damascus, Maryland
University of Kentucky faculty
American Episcopal priests